Euchaetes castalla is a moth of the family Erebidae. It was described by William Barnes and James Halliday McDunnough in 1910. It is found in the US state of Arizona.

The wingspan is about 41 mm.

References

 

Phaegopterina
Moths described in 1910